Alfonso Tusell (11 April 1906 – 23 February 1960) was a Spanish water polo player. He competed in the men's tournament at the 1920 Summer Olympics.

References

External links
 

1906 births
1960 deaths
Spanish male water polo players
Olympic water polo players of Spain
Water polo players at the 1920 Summer Olympics
Water polo players from Barcelona